Katherine Cannon (born September 6, 1953 in Hartford, Connecticut) is an American actress.

Career
Cannon's early roles included Hawaii Five-O (episode: "Time and Memories", 10/7/1970); Fools' Parade (1971); Private Duty Nurses (1971); Women in Chains (1972); Emergency! (1973); and Baa Baa Black Sheep. She appeared in two Barnaby Jones, episodes, titled "Dangerous Summer" (02/11/1975) and "Killer on Campus" (03/24/77), respectively. She appeared in a recurring role on CHiPs (1978, 1979, and 1981) as female trucker Robbie Davis. 

She first attracted notice in High Noon, Part II: The Return of Will Kane (1980) playing Amy Kane. She later played schoolteacher Mae Woodward in the TV series, Father Murphy, and appeared in the sci-fi thriller The Hidden in 1987. She is currently best known for playing Felice Martin, the cheating and domineering mother of Donna Martin (Tori Spelling), on the long-running teen series, Beverly Hills, 90210.

Personal life
The daughter of a ballroom dancer, Cannon was raised in Laguna Beach, California. She was introduced to acting by Judy Farrell, wife of actor Mike Farrell. 

In 1974, Cannon married commercial director Richard Chambers. The couple had one son, Colin Thomas Chambers, before divorcing in 1980. In 2001, she remarried, to actor Dean Butler who played Almanzo Wilder for several seasons on Little House on the Prairie. They met when Cannon auditioned for the female lead in the Michael Landon series Father Murphy.

Filmography

Film

Television

References

External links

Demetria Fulton previewed Katherine Cannon on Barnaby Jones in episode titled, "Dangerous Summer" (02/11/1975).

Living people
1950 births
Actresses from Hartford, Connecticut
American television actresses
21st-century American women